ASOC may refer to:

 Anarcho-socialism
 Atlanta Symphony Orchestra Chorus
 Altered state of consciousness
 Advanced Linux Sound Architecture,  ALSA System on Chip
 Amateur Station Operator's Certificate
 Applescript ObjC Binding, a.k.a. ApplescriptObjC
 Antarctic and Southern Ocean Coalition, international environmental organization
 Air Support Operations Center, a division of the United States Army 
 Australian and New Zealand Standard Offence Classification, see